An array is simply a group of objects, and the array factor is a measure of how much a specific characteristic changes because of the grouping. This phenomenon is observed when antennas are grouped together. The radiation (or reception) pattern of the antenna group is considerably different from that of a single antenna. This is due to the constructive and destructive interference properties of radio waves. A well designed antenna array, allows the broadcast power to be directed to where it is needed most.  

These antenna arrays are typically one dimensional, as seen on collinear dipole arrays, or two dimensional as on military phased arrays.

In order to simplify the mathematics, a number of assumptions are typically made:
  1. all radiators are equal in every respect
  2. all radiators are uniformly spaced
  3. the signal phase shift between radiators is constant.

The array factor  is the complex-valued far-field radiation pattern obtained for an array of  isotropic radiators located at coordinates , as determined by:

The array factor is defined in the transmitting mode, with the time convention . A corresponding expression can be derived for the receiving mode, where a negative sign appears in the exponential factors, as derived in reference.

References

See also
 Array antenna

Radar
Antennas
Signal processing